Coproica acutangula is a species of lesser dung fly in the family Sphaeroceridae. It is found in Europe.

References

Sphaeroceridae
Articles created by Qbugbot
Insects described in 1847